George Sherman (1908–1991) was an American film director and producer.

George Sherman may also refer to:

 George Sherman (comics) (1928–1974), publicist and head of the Publications Department at the Disney Studio
 George C. Sherman (1799–1853), New York politician
 George C. Sherman Jr. (c. 1911–1986), American polo player
 George Dallas Sherman (1844–1927), military band leader

See also